Hyaluronidase deficiency is a condition caused by mutations in HYAL1, and characterized by multiple soft-tissue masses.

Signs and Symptoms 
As hyaluronidase deficiency is an extremely rare disorder a clear clinical picture of the disease has not been formed. However, the following symptoms may occur:
Multiple soft tissue masses which may experience temporary episodes of painful swelling. 
Temporary episodes of generalised cutaneous swelling.
Frequent episodes of otitis media.
Short stature.
Mildy dysmorphic facial features such as a flattened nasal bridge, bifid uvula and a submucosal cleft palate.
Joint movement and intellectual ability are unaffected.

See also 
 Morquio syndrome
 Hunter syndrome
 Hurler syndrome 
 Skin lesion

References

External links 

Skin conditions resulting from errors in metabolism